Glendower, now known as Glendower Historic Mansion and Arboretum, is a historic Greek Revival style house located at 105 Cincinnati Avenue, U.S. Route 42, Cincinnati Avenue, in Lebanon, Ohio. It was built in 1836 by Amos Bennett for John Milton Williams, a Lebanon merchant, and named for Owain Glyndŵr (often anglicised as "Owen Glendower"). It has been called "one of the finest examples of Residential Greek Revival architecture style in the Midwest."

On November 10, 1970, it was added to the National Register of Historic Places.

Current use
Until 2007, Glendower was operated and maintained by the Ohio Historical Society. On December 3, 2007, it was transferred to the Warren County Historical Society. The Society offers tours of the home from June through August.

The grounds of Glendower are often used by Civil War reenactors.

See also
 List of Registered Historic Places in Warren County, Ohio

References

External links

 Warren County Historical Society page on the home
 OHS's page on the home (archived)

National Register of Historic Places in Warren County, Ohio
Houses completed in 1836
Museums in Warren County, Ohio
Houses on the National Register of Historic Places in Ohio
Historic house museums in Ohio
Historical society museums in Ohio
Houses in Warren County, Ohio